Together Alone is an album by American jazz saxophonists Joseph Jarman and Anthony Braxton recorded in 1971 and released on the Delmark label.

Reception

Scott Yanow, in his review for AllMusic calls the album a "disappointment considering the talents involved". He states "not a lot of magic or close communication occurs, and the improvisations tend to ramble."

Track listing
 "Together Alone" (Joseph Jarman) - 5:39 
 "Dawn Dance One" (Jarman) - 13:46 
 "Morning [Including Circles]" (Jarman) - 2:18 
 "Ck7 (GN) 436" - (Anthony Braxton) - 6:10 
 "SBN-A-1 66k" (Braxton) - 14:53

Personnel
Anthony Braxton - alto saxophone, contrabass clarinet, flute, piano, vocals
Joseph Jarman - sopranino saxophone, soprano saxophone, alto saxophone, flute, synthesiser, bells, vocals

References

Delmark Records albums
Anthony Braxton albums
Joseph Jarman albums
1974 albums
Albums produced by Bob Koester